The Itaúnas State Park is a state park in the state of Espírito Santo, Brazil.
It protects the lower reaches of the Itaúnas River and a strip of marshes, dunes and beaches along the Atlantic coast of the north of the state.

Location

The Itaúnas State Park is in the municipality of Conceição da Barra, Espírito Santo.
It protects a strip of the Atlantic coast from north of the town of Conceição da Barra, Espírito Santo, up to the border with the state of Bahia.
The river approaches the coast at the settlement of Itaúnas and then runs southwest, parallel to the coast behind a sand bar, before entering the Atlantic Ocean to the north of Conceição da Barra.

History

The Itaúnas State Park was created by state governor decree 4.967-E of 8 November 1991.
In 1992 the park was listed by UNESCO as a World Heritage Site.
It became part of the Central Atlantic Forest Ecological Corridor, created in 2002.

Environment

The park contains 23 archaeological sites with traces of human settlements such as chipped stones, indigenous pottery and artifacts from the colonial era.
Vegetation includes coastal forest, with fragments of forest endangered in Espírito Santo, restinga, dunes and estuarine mangroves.
The various habitats are in good condition, and have great diversity of plant species, with over 414 species recorded.
There are 43 species of mammals, 183 of birds. 32 of reptiles, 29 of amphibians and 101 of fish.
Mammals include ocelots, capuchin monkeys and sloths.
Threats include illegal fishing, hunting, firewood extraction and fruit collection, the presence of domestic animals such as horses, dogs and oxen, and irregular occupation by squatters.

Activities

As of 2015 the opening hours were from 8:30 to 17:30.
The park is suitable for ecotourism, hiking and swimming in the river and the ocean.
Visitors may take guided horseback tours, or may explore by kayak, canoe, jeep, bicycle or on foot.
There is a visitor center in the village of Itaúnas, with the headquarters of the Tamar project, which protects sea turtles.
The visitor center has a display of archaeological finds, and gives workshops in crafts, local music and painting.

Notes

Sources

State parks of Brazil
Protected areas of Espírito Santo